Beyt-e Khalaf (also Romanized as Beyt-e Khalāf) is a village in Moshrageh Rural District, Moshrageh District, Ramshir County, Khuzestan Province, Iran. At the 2006 census, its population was 181, in 28 families.

References 

Populated places in Ramshir County